Pineridge (formerly, Kenyon and Pine Ridge) is an unincorporated community in Fresno County, California.

The Kenyon post office opened in 1890, the name was changed to Pine Ridge in 1892, to Pineridge in 1895, and closed in 1944. The name Kenyon is in honor of Silas W. Kenyon, its first postmaster.

The community is home to Cressmans General Store (which was burned down in the 2020 Creek fire but is now reopened) and Pine Ridge Elementary School. It has its own Volunteer Fire department.

The population of the area is approximately 300 people.

References

See also
Burrough Valley
Tollhouse, California
Clovis, California

Unincorporated communities in California
Unincorporated communities in Fresno County, California